The canton of Torcy is a French administrative division, located in the arrondissement of Torcy, in the Seine-et-Marne département (Île-de-France région).

Demographics

Composition 
At the French canton reorganisation which came into effect in March 2015, the canton was reduced from 6 to 5 communes:
Bussy-Saint-Georges
Bussy-Saint-Martin
Collégien
Jossigny
Torcy

See also
Cantons of the Seine-et-Marne department
Communes of the Seine-et-Marne department

References

Torcy